The Journal of Thoracic Disease is a peer-reviewed open access medical journal covering pulmonology. It was established in December 2009 and is published monthly by AME Publishing Company. It is the official journal of the State Key Laboratory of Respiratory Disease, the Guangzhou Institute of Respiratory Disease, the First Affiliated Hospital of Guangzhou Medical University, and the Society for Thoracic Disease. The editor-in-chief is Zhong Nanshan (Guangzhou Institute of Respiratory Diseases). According to the Journal Citation Reports, the journal has a 2016 impact factor of 2.365.

References

External links

Publications established in 2009
Open access journals
Monthly journals
Pulmonology journals
English-language journals

AME Publishing Company academic journals